Fred "Skeeter" Fleiter (3 May 1897 – 10 January 1973) was an Australian rules footballer who played for South Melbourne in the Victorian Football League (VFL).

Football
Fleiter played as a ruck rover and made his league debut in 1919. He played his career beside ruckman Roy Cazaly and is credited with coming up for the famous phrase "Up there Cazaly". It was used as a signal to signify that Cazaly was free to run through and leap for the ball.

He played his last game for South Melbourne in 1925 but returned four years later as a non-playing coach for a season.

References

External links

Fred Fleiter's coaching record at AFL Tables

1897 births
1973 deaths
Australian rules footballers from Melbourne
Australian Rules footballers: place kick exponents
Sydney Swans players
Sydney Swans coaches
Place of birth missing
People from Albert Park, Victoria